Parasmittina is a genus of bryozoans belonging to the family Smittinidae.

The genus has cosmopolitan distribution.

Species:

Parasmittina abrolhosensis 
Parasmittina acondylata 
Parasmittina aculeata 
Parasmittina acuta 
Parasmittina agathae 
Parasmittina alanbanneri 
Parasmittina alaskensis 
Parasmittina alba 
Parasmittina aleutensis 
Parasmittina alitis 
Parasmittina amazonensis 
Parasmittina anderseni 
Parasmittina aotea 
Parasmittina areolata 
Parasmittina atypica 
Parasmittina auris 
Parasmittina avicularissima 
Parasmittina aviculifera 
Parasmittina aviculifera 
Parasmittina aviculoumbonata 
Parasmittina baccula 
Parasmittina barbadensis 
Parasmittina betamorphaea 
Parasmittina bimucronata 
Parasmittina breli 
Parasmittina californica 
Parasmittina californiensis 
Parasmittina cheilodon 
Parasmittina chikagawaensis 
Parasmittina circinanata 
Parasmittina circularis 
Parasmittina collifera 
Parasmittina collum 
Parasmittina contraria 
Parasmittina crosslandi 
Parasmittina cryptoavicularia 
Parasmittina cyclops 
Parasmittina delicatula 
Parasmittina dentigera 
Parasmittina dependeo 
Parasmittina distincta 
Parasmittina dolabrata 
Parasmittina dubitata 
Parasmittina eccentrica 
Parasmittina echinata 
Parasmittina egyptiaca 
Parasmittina emersoni 
Parasmittina ensifera 
Parasmittina erecta 
Parasmittina exasperatrix 
Parasmittina exiguiuncinata 
Parasmittina fistulata 
Parasmittina floridana 
Parasmittina fraseri 
Parasmittina galerita 
Parasmittina geometrica 
Parasmittina glabra 
Parasmittina glomerata 
Parasmittina gujaratica 
Parasmittina hanzawae 
Parasmittina harudiensis 
Parasmittina hastingsae 
Parasmittina ilioensis 
Parasmittina inalienata 
Parasmittina indigenella 
Parasmittina indiginella 
Parasmittina japonica 
Parasmittina jeffreysi 
Parasmittina johni 
Parasmittina kauaiensis 
Parasmittina labellum 
Parasmittina latiavicularia 
Parasmittina lavela 
Parasmittina leviavicularia 
Parasmittina livingstonei 
Parasmittina longirostrata 
Parasmittina loxa 
Parasmittina loxoides 
Parasmittina luteoserrula 
Parasmittina macginitiei 
Parasmittina macphersonae 
Parasmittina margaritata 
Parasmittina marsupialis 
Parasmittina masudai 
Parasmittina mauritiana 
Parasmittina mexicana 
Parasmittina multiaviculata 
Parasmittina munita 
Parasmittina murarmata 
Parasmittina nasuta 
Parasmittina natalensis 
Parasmittina nitida 
Parasmittina novella 
Parasmittina obstructa 
Parasmittina oculinae 
Parasmittina okadai 
Parasmittina onychorrhyncha 
Parasmittina ornata 
Parasmittina ovilirata 
Parasmittina papulata 
Parasmittina paradicei 
Parasmittina parsevaliformis 
Parasmittina parsevalii 
Parasmittina parsevalioidea 
Parasmittina parsloeparsloei 
Parasmittina parvitatis 
Parasmittina parviuncinata 
Parasmittina pectinata 
Parasmittina peristoaviculata 
Parasmittina pinctatae 
Parasmittina plana 
Parasmittina projecta 
Parasmittina protecta 
Parasmittina proximoproducta 
Parasmittina pugetensis 
Parasmittina pyriformis 
Parasmittina raigiformis 
Parasmittina raigii 
Parasmittina raigioidea 
Parasmittina recidiva 
Parasmittina regularis 
Parasmittina rimula 
Parasmittina rostriformis 
Parasmittina rouvillei 
Parasmittina saccoi 
Parasmittina santacruzana 
Parasmittina serrula 
Parasmittina serruloides 
Parasmittina shibikawaensis 
Parasmittina simpulata 
Parasmittina solenosmilioides 
Parasmittina soulesi 
Parasmittina spathulata 
Parasmittina spiculata 
Parasmittina spondylicola 
Parasmittina subtubulata 
Parasmittina talismani 
Parasmittina tatianae 
Parasmittina telum 
Parasmittina triangularis 
Parasmittina trianguliforma 
Parasmittina trispinosa 
Parasmittina tropica 
Parasmittina trunculata 
Parasmittina tubula 
Parasmittina tubulata 
Parasmittina turbula 
Parasmittina uncinata 
Parasmittina vacuramosa 
Parasmittina variabilis 
Parasmittina veniliae 
Parasmittina winstonae

References

Bryozoan genera